Manmad ( [mənmaːɖ]) is one of the towns in Nashik district in the state of Maharashtra in India. It is the  third largest city in Nashik district, with a population of approximately 80,000. Geographically it lies within Nandgaon Tehsil in Nashik District. Though it has a larger area and population than most Tehsils in the district, it does not have a Tehsil office.
 
Manmad houses the largest grain storage warehouses of Asia which are administered by Food Corporation of India, and also the offices of petroleum companies like Bharat Petroleum, Hindustan Petroleum and Indian Oil. This is predominantly Railway town. All development in the city took place around railway activity. The city also has a popular Sikh Gurudwara. Manmad is one of the largest markets for onion producing farmers after Lasalgaon; many farmers from nearby villages sell their farm produce in Manmad to wholesale traders, who in turn sell it in Mumbai. The Central Railway Engineering workshop at Manmad, which constructs and maintains railway bridges for central railways, marked 100 years of operation in December 2005. The Centralized Engineering Workshop is under the direct control of Chief Engineer, Central Railway, Mumbai.  This workshop undertakes fabrication of steel structural items, including bridge girders (the longest span built so far is 400 ft or 122m – KRCL); approximately 1160 employees work in the Engineering Workshop.

Bharat Petroleum has installed a station near Manmad which collects the petroleum products from BPCL & HPCL refineries and carries to interior part of Maharashtra. The petroleum products are loaded in rail wagons and transported to other places.

Manmad railway station 
Manmad railway station is a major railway junction on the Central Railway line. There are four railway lines converging at Manmad, one each from Bhusawal, Daund–Pune, Secunderabad–Manmad and the most important one from Mumbai. Manmad is a very crucial junction for all those who want to travel to Shirdi, Pune, Mumbai, Hyderabad, Tirupati, Konkan, Marathwada and Bangalore. It is a city with a majority of its population employed by Central Railway and Food Corporation of India. This station served as important inter-connection between Nizam State Railway (then metre-gauge railway) and GIP Railway till 1948.

Transport 

Originally the Manmad town lies on Malegaon–Manmad–Ahmadnagar–Pune Road. It was important link for Holkars to deal with Peshwas at Pune. It was important link for Peshwas for entering Northern India and especially Delhi. Other roads link with Chandwad and Nandgaon. The city has huge traffic of agricultural produce, transport of petroleum, food grain & cement from Manmad Station. Traditionally (before the 1960s), Nashik district faced acute shortage of food grains. Food grains from Marathwada region were transported through this town, destined to Nashik district.

Geography
It has an average elevation of 580 metres (1902 feet).

Demographics
 India census, Manmad has a population of 80,058. Males constitute 52% of the population and females 48%. Manmad has an average literacy rate of 75%, higher than the national average of 59.5%: male literacy is 81%, and female literacy is 69%. In Manmad, 13% of the population is under 6 years of age.

References

 
Cities and towns in Nashik district